Consejo Mundial de Lucha Libre Co., Ltd. (CMLL; , "World Wrestling Council") is a lucha libre professional wrestling promotion based in Mexico City. The promotion was previously known as Empresa Mexicana de Lucha Libre (EMLL) (Mexican Wrestling Enterprise). Founded in 1933, it is the oldest professional wrestling promotion still in existence.

CMLL currently recognizes and promotes 12 World Championships in various weight divisions and classifications, six national level and six regional level championships. The CMLL Anniversary Show series is the longest-running annual major show, starting in 1934, with the CMLL 87th Anniversary Show being the most recent. CMLL also regularly promotes major events under the names Homenaje a Dos Leyendas ("Homage to two legends"), Sin Piedad ("No Mercy"), Sin Salida ("No Escape"), Infierno en el Ring ("Inferno in the Ring") during the year. CMLL has promoted their regular weekly Super Viernes ("Super Friday") on a regular basis since the 1930s. Founder Salvador Lutteroth funded the building of Arena Coliseo in 1943, making it the first building in Mexico built specifically for professional wrestling.

History
Prior to 1933, lucha libre shows in Mexico were primarily promoted by foreign promoters doing the occasional match through Mexico or a few scattered local promoters, especially along the U.S. border, who brought in American professional wrestlers as their main attractions.

Creation

In 1929, Salvador Lutteroth González, who at the time was a property inspector for the Mexican tax department, moved to Ciudad Juárez, near the Mexico–United States border. During a trip to El Paso, Texas, Lutteroth witnessed a professional wrestling show and was intrigued by it, especially the main event, Greek wrestler Gus Pappas. Four years later, Lutteroth, along with his financial backer Francisco Ahumada, chartered Empresa Mexicana de Lucha Libre (EMLL; literally "Mexican Wrestling Enterprise"), the first Mexican-owned wrestling promotion in the country. EMLL held their first show on September 21, 1933, considered the "birth of Lucha libre", and which led to Lutteroth being known as "the father of Lucha Libre".

EMLL initially tried to book Arena Nacional, the premier boxing venue in Mexico City, but the promoters would not let him rent it, forcing Lutteroth and EMLL to take up residence in Arena Modelo, an abandoned and run-down facility that Lutteroth was able to use as his home base. The concept of Lucha Libre quickly became very popular, so much so that the EMLL 1st Anniversary Show drew a sold-out crowd of 5,000 paying fans. In 1934, an American wrestler debuted in Mexico under a black leather mask, and Lutteroth dubbed him La Maravilla Enmascarada or "The Masked Marvel". In the United States the concept of the masked wrestler was more of a mid-level attraction, but the reaction to La Maravilla Enmascarada led to Lutteroth and EMLL officials to introduce more masks, starting with a wrestler known simply as El Enmascarado ("The Masked Wrestler"), and later El Murciélago Enmascarado ("The Masked Bat"). Through the use of the masks and ring characters EMLL helped create the sacred position of the mask in Lucha libre, making it the ultimate status symbol for luchadors. In the early days of EMLL, most of the top names were Americans, but with time EMLL introduced several Mexican natives that became so popular that they began to main-event most of the EMLL shows. To expand their business, EMLL began working with a number of local wrestling promoters across Mexico, allowing them to use the EMLL name and some of their contracted wrestlers while also gaining access to local wrestlers in return. Each booking office was independent of each other, but the main office in Mexico City had the final say if there were disputes over who would be able to book certain wrestlers.

In 1942, a masked wrestler clad in silver, simply known as El Santo ("the Saint"), a man who go on to become a cultural icon in Mexico and is often cited as the greatest Mexican wrestler of all time. With the popularity of El Santo as well as other Mexican stars such as Bobby Bonales, Tarzán López, Cavernario Galindo and Gory Guerrero Arena Modelo eventually became too small to accommodate the demand for tickets. To solve the problem Lutteroth financed the construction of Arena Coliseo in Mexico City, the first arena in Mexico built specifically for professional wrestling and the first sports building in Mexico to have built in air conditioning. The arena, nicknamed the "Lagunilla Funnel" due to its interior shape would hold over 8,800 spectators when configured for Lucha libre or boxing. Arena Coliseo began hosting EMLL's annual Anniversary shows starting with the 10th Anniversary show.

In 1953, Salvador Lutteroth joined the US based National Wrestling Alliance (NWA), becoming the official NWA territory for all of Mexico, known as "NWA-EMLL" outside Mexico. By joining the NWA, Lutteroth and EMLL gained control of the NWA World Light Heavyweight Championship. They were also able to re-brand their "World Middleweight Championship" to become the NWA World Middleweight Championship and their "World Welterweight Championship" became the NWA World Welterweight Championship. In the early 1950s television became as a viable entertainment medium in Mexico which was set to bolster the popularity of EMLL, but Arena Coliseo was not equipped properly for television transmissions. As it turns out luck was on Lutteroth and EMLL's side as Lutteroth and the personnel at Arena Coliseo bought a lottery ticket worth 5 million Pesos. Lutteroth used his portion of the winnings to finance the construction of Arena México, on the location where Arena Modelo used to sit. Arena México enabled EMLL to broadcast their weekly wrestling shows across Mexico, yielding a popularity explosion for the sport. Starting in 1956, with the EMLL 23rd Anniversary Show all anniversary shows were held in Arena México, except the EMLL 46th Anniversary Show. Over time the arena became known as "The Cathedral of Lucha Libre".

Over time, Lutteroth retired from the day-to-day operations of EMLL leaving the company in the hands of his son Salvador "Chavo" Lutteroth Jr.

In 1975, local promoter Francisco Flores, along with EMLL trainer Ray Mendoza broke away from EMLL, citing their displeasure with EMLL's conservative, restrictive promotional style. The two took a number of EMLL's younger wrestlers with them to form Lucha Libre Internacional, S. C, later known as the Universal Wrestling Association (UWA). With the creation of the UWA EMLL faced a rival national promotion for the first time.

Becoming CMLL

In the mid-1980s, Chavo Lutteroth II retired, allowing his nephew Paco Alonso, grandson of Chavo Lutteroth I, to take control of EMLL. In the late 1980s, EMLL decided to leave the NWA, seeking to distance themselves from the political wrestling in the National Wrestling Alliance. At that time, EMLL, with the consent of Paco Alonso, the booker Antonio Peña and the promoter Humberto Elizondo devised the creation of the Consejo Mundial de Lucha Libre (CMLL; "World Wrestling Council") to establish a new identity after the NWA split, in order to have their own titles and organize promoters who wanted to join, in addition to sounding more international. From 1991 through 1993 CMLL created eight "CMLL World" titles in addition to the three NWA branded titles they retained and a slew of other championships. At the start of the 1990s the company began appearing on the national Televisa network, which led to a second big boom in business due to the renewed national television exposure, in the mid-1970s through the 1980s, magazines and newspapers were the sole medium of Lucha Libre for most Mexicans.

AAA split and rivalry
In the mid-1980s, retired wrestler Antonio Peña became one of the main bookers for EMLL, helping determine who would win matches, what storylines to use and so on, he was also a driving force behind the name change to Consejo Mundial de Lucha Libre. Peña would often clash with Juan Herrera, the other main booker for CMLL at the time. Herrera wanted to maintain the old style of booking with heavyweights such as Atlantis, El Dandy and El Satánico, while Peña wanted to feature younger, faster moving wrestlers such as Konnan, Octagón or Máscara Sagrada. In the end CMLL owner Paco Alonso decided to go with Juan Herrera's booking style.

After Paco Alonso chose to ignore Peña's booking ideas, Peña began negotiations with Televisa television channel to fund a new wrestling promotion that would provide Televisa with weekly wrestling shows. In 1992 Peña started a booking agency, providing wrestlers and matches for the Televisa owned Asistencia Asesoría y Administración (AAA) promotion. While Peña technically owned the promotion Televisa owns the rights to the AAA name. In a move that mirrored Flores' departure in the 1970s Peña left the promotion alongside a number of young wrestlers who were unhappy with their position in the promotion. With the creation of AAA the promotion replaced the UWA as Mexico's other main wrestling promotion, creating a long running rivalry between CMLL and AAA. Starting in 1996 CMLL began promoting an annual show in March, first paying homage to Salvador Lutteroth, then later Lutteroth and El Santo and then finally becoming the Homenaje a Dos Leyendas ("Homage to Two Legends") annual show series.

CMLL in the 21st century

From 2007 to 2009, CMLL had a working relationship with American promotion Total Nonstop Action Wrestling, which saw CMLL's Averno, Rey Bucanero, Último Guerrero and Volador Jr. winning the 2008 TNA World X Cup and TNA worker Alex Shelley winning the 2008 CMLL International Grand Prix. In 2008, CMLL established a working relationship with New Japan Pro-Wrestling as part of "G-1 World", several wrestlers have since toured between the two companies winning titles, including Místico winning the IWGP Junior Heavyweight Championship and Jushin Thunder Liger winning the CMLL Universal Championship tournament. Since 2011, the two promotions have annually co-promoted events in Japan, under the name Fantastica Mania. In 2011, CMLL established a working relationship with Japanese women's promotion Universal Woman's Pro Wrestling Reina and announced that the two promotions would create a new championship for women who have been in the professional wrestling industry for less than ten years, called the CMLL-Reina International Junior Championship. This was followed by the establishment of the CMLL-Reina International Championship one year later.

On March 16, 2010, a video was posted on YouTube featuring an interview David Marquez had with NWA Executive Director and Legal Counsel Robert Trobich. Trobich announced that CMLL did not have permission to use the NWA trademark. The rights to usage of the NWA trademark in Mexico is now held by NWA Mexico, represented by Blue Demon, Jr. CMLL replaced the three championships with the NWA World Historic Light Heavyweight Championship, NWA World Historic Middleweight Championship and the NWA World Historic Welterweight Championship.

On September 19, 2014, CMLL became only the second promotion in the Americas, after WWE, to draw a $1 million gate with their 81st Anniversary Show, headlined by a Mask vs. Mask match between Atlantis and Último Guerrero.

On November 6, 2014, the promotion made an alliance with the Mexican independent group Lucha Libre Elite to help bring independent wrestlers into CMLL which ended in early 2018.

On July 6, 2016, NJPW announced that they would broadcast CMLL Friday shows in their video-streaming service, NJPW World. On August 10, CMLL announced a working relationship with American promotion Ring of Honor (ROH). The two promotions were linked through their separate relationships with NJPW. The alliance with ROH ended on April 27, 2021.

On July 7, 2019, CMLL announced the death of the president of the company Paco Alonso (who died a day before, on July 6). On July 10, CMLL appointed Sofía Alonso as the president of said company. On August 26, 2019, it was revealed that Sofía Alonso had been relieved of her position and returned to the company's public area, appointing Salvador "Chavo" Lutteroth III as the chairman and CEO of PROMECOR-CMLL..

Style and television

CMLL regularly runs seven shows on five days in a week. The biggest weekly show being the Friday night Super Viernes ("Super Friday") show held in the famous Arena Mexico in Mexico City. CMLL runs show at Saturday in Arena Coliseo, at Sunday (two shows) in Arena Mexico and Arena Coliseo Guadalajara, Monday in Arena Puebla, and Tuesday in Arena Mexico and Arena Coliseo Guadalajara. The Super Viernes, the Monday Arena Puebla, and the Tuesday Arena Mexico show are televised.

Of all the major professional wrestling promotions in the world, CMLL is one of the most conservative, having earned the nickname "The serious and the stable" (La Seria y Estable) over time. Matches with blood are not broadcast unless it accidentally happens during a live event. CMLL rarely uses specialty or "gimmick matches" outside a limited number of steel cage matches and the occasional Super Libre, no-disqualification matches.  While other promotions have adopted matches such as the ladder match, CMLL remains much more traditional. They also have strict rules for what they will allow to happen during their shows, on one occasion a match between Dr. Wagner Jr. and L. A. Park during the CMLL 75th Anniversary Show degenerated into a brawl on the floor that was so out of control that both wrestlers were fired by CMLL a short time later. CMLL also has strict rules on what wrestlers can and cannot say during their shows, a rule illustrated in 2015 where L.A. Park was fired from the promotion only three weeks after returning due to a profanity-laden rant during a CMLL show.

CMLL's main programming, hosted by Alfonso Morales, Leobardo Magadan and Miguel Linares, is broadcast regularly on Televisa in Mexico, on LATV in the United States, and formerly on Telelatino in Canada and The Wrestling Channel in the United Kingdom. CMLL also had a syndicated show called "Sin Limite de Tiempo" ("with no time limit") which shows matches from Arena Coliseo shows and matches they could not fit onto the regular broadcast. It aired in Los Angeles on KWHY and Also Air in San Francisco on KEMO-TV. This show was followed up by "Guerreros del Ring" on Canal 52MX. Also, Spanish-language American sports channel Fox Sports en Español recently started broadcasting CMLL programming. Recently CMLL also added the Mexican network Cadena Tres to its list of networks airing CMLL Wrestling. Galavision began airing CMLL wrestling in the spring of 2011. Galavision shows only a one-hour version while LATV has shown a two-hour version. In 2015, several of CMLL's shows became available live on their YouTube channel and they have held a number of internet-Pay Per Views (PPVs).

Recurring shows
Each year CMLL promotes a number of signature events, some shown as pay-per-view events and others shown on regular television. Over the last couple of years CMLL have held three regular events each year and a number of one off, special events. The Major show, shown in order of when they happen during the year, include:

Roster

Current championships

CMLL-promoted world championships

{| class="wikitable sortable" style="text-align: center; font-size:85%;"
!Championship
!colspan=2|Current champion(s)
!Reign
!Date won
!Days held
!Location
!Notes
!Ref.
|-
|CMLL World Heavyweight Championship
|
|Gran Guerrero
|1
|
|
|Mexico City, D.F.
|align=left|Defeated Hechicero  at Lunes Clásico.
|
|-
|CMLL World Light Heavyweight Championship
|
|Niebla Roja
|1
|
|
|Mexico City, D.F.
|align=left|Defeated Rey Bucanero for the vacant title at ''CMLL Sabados De Coliseo. currently hold the title record
|
|-
|CMLL World Middleweight Championship
|
|Dragón Rojo Jr.
|align=center |2
|align=center |
|align=center |
|Mexico City, D.F.
|align=left|Defeated El Soberano at Arena Coliseo 79th Anniversary Show.
|
|-
|CMLL World Welterweight Championship
|
|Titán 
|1
|
|
|Mexico City, D.F.
|align=left|Defeated El Soberano at CMLL Domingos Arena Mexico.
|
|-
|CMLL World Lightweight Championship
|
|Stigma
|1
|
|
|Mexico City, D.F.
|align=left|Defeated Suicida in a tournament final to win the title.
|
|-
|CMLL World Mini-Estrella Championship
|
|Shockercito
|1
|
|
|Mexico City, D.F.
|align=left|Defeated Pierrothito at CMLL Domingos Arena Mexico.
|
|-
|CMLL World Micro-Estrellas Championship
|
|Micro Gemelo Diablo I
|1
|
|
|Mexico City, D.F.
|align=left|Defeated Chamuel at CMLL Domingos Arena Mexico.
|
|-
|CMLL World Tag Team Championship
|
|Los Nuevos Ingobernables
|1
|
|
|Mexico City, D.F.
|align=left|defeating Titán and Volador Jr. at CMLL Domingos Arena Mexico.
|
|-
|CMLL World Trios Championship
|
|Los Malditos (El Sagrado, Gemelo Diablo I & Gemelo Diablo II)
|1
|
|
|Mexico City, D.F.
|align=left|Defeated Los Guerreros Laguneros (Gran Guerrero & Ultimo Guerrero) and Atlantis to win the vacant titles.
|
|-
|CMLL World Women's Championship
|
|Princesa Sugehit
|1
|
|
|Mexico City, D.F.
|align=left|Defeated Marcela at CMLL Super Viernes.
|
|-
|NWA World Historic Light Heavyweight Championship
|
|Stuka Jr.
|1
|
|
|Mexico City, D.F.
|align=left|Defeated Hechicero at CMLL Martes Arena Mexico.currently hold the title record
|
|-
|NWA World Historic Middleweight Championship
|
|Místico
|1
|
|
|Guadalajara, Jalisco
|align=left|Defeated Último Guerrero at CMLL Guadalajara Martes.currently hold the title record
|
|-
|NWA World Historic Welterweight Championship
|
|Volador Jr.
|3
|
|
|Mexico City, D.F.
|align=left|Defeated Matt Taven at CMLL Super Viernes - Negro Casas 40. Aniversario.Consejo Mundial de Lucha Libre.currently hold the title record
|
|}

CMLL-promoted secondary championships

CMLL Guadalajara championships

Co-promoted championships

No longer promoted / Inactive

Tournaments

CMLL conducts several annual tournaments which usually signify a big push. Tournaments have been left out of the schedule for unexplained reasons. Some tournaments are conducted as torneo ciberneticos, a large multi-man tag team elimination match, others are normal single elimination tournament.

Active tournaments

Past annual tournaments
These are all the tournament that have been held in the past by Consejo Mundial de Lucha Libre but have not been promoted in the last two years.

BroadcastersDomestic: TDUN (2020–present)
 Ticketmaster Live
 Televisión Mexiquense
 MVS TV 
 52MX 
 Nu9ve
 Megacable 
 Nuestra Visión
 VideosOficialesCMLL
 Claro Sports
 Multimedios Televisión
 TVC Deportes
 Marca
 El Heraldo TV
 Imagen Televisión
 Fox Deportes Mexico
 Televisa Guadalajara 
 Terra
 TeleFórmulaInternational (current): LATV 
 Nuestra Visión 
 Multimedios Televisión
 Galavisión
 KWHY-TV
 TV Asahi 
 Fighting TV Samurai
 NJPW World
 Fight Network
 Fight Network USA
 Fight Network Turkey
 Fight Network International
 VideosOficialesCMLL
 CMLL On TwitchWorldwide:
 NJPW World
 VideosOficialesCMLL
 CMLL On TwitchInternational (former):'''
 Azteca América
 FITE TV
 The Fight Network
 Telelatino
 Fox Deportes USA
 KEMO-TV
 Honor Club

See also

Professional wrestling in Mexico
List of professional wrestling promotions in Mexico

References

External links

 (in Spanish)

 
Mexican professional wrestling promotions
1933 establishments in Mexico
Lucha libre
National Wrestling Alliance members